Aleksandr Tretyakov may refer to:

 Aleksandr Tretyakov (wrestler) (born 1972), Russian Olympic wrestler
 Aleksandr Tretyakov (skeleton racer) (born 1985), Russian Olympic skeleton racer